Federico Casagrande (born 27 February 1980 in Treviso, Veneto, Italy) is an Italian jazz guitarist.

Career 
Casagrande graduated from the Berklee College of Music in 2006. In 2007 he won first prize in the Montreux Jazz Festival guitar competition. He has released at least ten albums as leader or co-leader and has been described by The Irish Times as a "rising star of the younger generation [of European jazz musicians]"

Discography 
 Conversations with Fulvio Sigurta (Impossible Ark, 2009)
 Hypercube with Marco Bucelli (2011)
 The Ancient Battle of the Invisible (CAM Jazz, 2012)
 At the End of the Day (CAM Jazz, 2015)
 Double Circle with Enrico Pieranunzi (CAM Jazz, 2015)
 Fast Forward (CAM Jazz, 2017)
 Lost Songs with Francesco Bearzatti (CAM Jazz, 2018)

External links 
 Official site

References 

1980 births
Living people
21st-century guitarists
21st-century Italian male musicians
Berklee College of Music alumni
Italian jazz guitarists
Italian male guitarists
Male jazz musicians